Antonios Georgoulis (born 25 March 1928) was a Greek wrestler. He competed at the 1952 Summer Olympics and the 1956 Summer Olympics.

References

External links
 

1928 births
Possibly living people
Greek male sport wrestlers
Olympic wrestlers of Greece
Wrestlers at the 1952 Summer Olympics
Wrestlers at the 1956 Summer Olympics
Place of birth missing
20th-century Greek people